Charles Lennon was a Republic of Ireland international footballer.

Lennon was capped three times for the Republic of Ireland at senior level. He made his debut in a 4–2 friendly defeat to Hungary on 16 December 1934.

He was part of the Shelbourne team that won the 1939 FAI Cup beating Sligo Rovers.

References

External links
 Profile from soccerscene.ie
 1939 FAI Cup Final report

Republic of Ireland association footballers
Republic of Ireland international footballers
St James's Gate F.C. players
Association footballers not categorized by position
Year of birth missing